This is a list of seasons of the National Hockey League (NHL), a professional ice hockey league, since its inception in 1917. The list also includes the seasons of the National Hockey Association (NHA), the predecessor organization of the NHL, which had several teams that would continue play in the NHL.Only two franchises, Montreal and Toronto, still exist from the founding of the league. The Quebec Bulldogs, which suspended after the last NHA season, returned to play in the third NHL season, although they were considered founding members of the NHL. The league would move the team to Hamilton in 1920 and dissolve the team in 1925. The original Ottawa Senators would continue in the league until 1935, where, after one season in St. Louis as the St. Louis Eagles, the franchise was dissolved by the league. The current Ottawa Senators franchise does recognize the history of the original Senators (through retired numbers and a heritage jersey).The list is sub-divided using the same eras as the series of articles on the History of the National Hockey League.

Championship format
Like predecessor leagues, the champion of the NHA league since its founding was the team with the best regular season record, with a playoff used only if more than one team had the best win–loss record. This changed in 1917 with the invention of the split-season, whereby the champion became the winner of the annual playoff. The NHL continued the split-season and playoff format upon the winding up of the NHA organization. Except for the 1919–20 season, when there was no playoff because Ottawa won both halves of the season, the champion of the NHL has been the playoff champion.

The NHA champion was awarded the O'Brien Cup. This was continued by the NHL. Until 1927, the NHL champion was awarded the O'Brien Cup, supplemented by the Prince of Wales Trophy, starting in 1925. To win the Stanley Cup, the NHL champion had to play and win a "world's series" with the champion of the Pacific Coast or Western Canada leagues. After 1927, the NHL playoff champion was awarded the Stanley Cup, while the O'Brien Cup and Prince of Wales Trophy were reused as division championship and playoff runner-up awards.

National Hockey Association

Hockey seasons traditionally started in January and ended in March until the 1910–11 season which was the first to start before the new year. The 1911–12 season saw the elimination of the rover position, reducing number of skaters per side to six. The 1916–17 season saw the introduction of the split schedule, an innovation attributed to Toronto NHA owner Eddie Livingstone. To symbolize the league championship, the NHA champion was awarded the O'Brien Cup, donated by the O'Brien family, owners of silver mines (being the source of the silver in the trophy), owners of several of the NHA franchises, and original owner of the Montreal Canadiens.

Notes
1. All champion teams are also Stanley Cup champions unless marked.
2. The league did not use tiebreakers to determine the top record. The two teams played off to determine the championship.
3. Toronto and Battalion did not participate in the second half.
4a. No Finals prior to 1914; Stanley Cup awarded to league winners and defended on a challenge basis.
4b. Finals in 1915 and 1916 contested between top two teams of regular season.
4c. Finals from 1917 through 1921 contested between qualifier from first half-season and qualifier from second half-season.

Early years

The NHL started with three of the six NHA clubs (Montreal Canadiens, Montreal Wanderers and Ottawa Senators) and a Toronto franchise run by the Toronto Arena Co., which leased the players of the Toronto Blueshirts. Almost immediately after starting the season, the Wanderers folded, leaving three teams to complete the season. The same three teams returned for 1918–19 before Quebec 'returned' for 1919–20, moving to Hamilton the following year. The same four-team configuration lasted until 1924–25 when the Montreal Maroons and the Boston Bruins joined the league. Expansion into other cities followed, lasting until the 1930s, when several teams folded.

The new NHL did not have a championship trophy at first. The O'Brien Cup was revived in November 1921, and served as the league championship trophy until 1927. The new Prince of Wales Trophy, donated in 1925, was also given to the league champion until 1927. Henceforth, the trophies were designated for divisional championships, and the Stanley Cup became the de facto league championship trophy.

Notes

Original Six era

Prior to the 1942–43 season, the New York Americans suspended operations. This reduced the number of teams to six, starting the 'Original Six' era. During the Original Six era, the NHL played in a single six-team division. Each season, four of the six teams qualified for the playoffs to determine the Stanley Cup and NHL champion.

Expansion years

Since 1967, the league re-organized several times as it grew. In 1967, the league played in two divisions, with the playoff winner of each division playing off for the NHL championship. As the league grew the league changed its championship format to allow cross-over seeding, then changed to a division-based championship, leading to conference-based championship, with conference champions playing off for the Stanley Cup. In 1985, the Presidents' Trophy was inaugurated to reward the team with the top regular season record, irrespective of division or conference.

Notes

Current era 

In 1993, coinciding with the naming of Gary Bettman as commissioner, the league re-organized into the Eastern and Western Conferences, with two divisions each, organized along geographical lines. The playoff format was changed to provide conference champions without divisional playoff champions. A new round of expansion began. By 2000–01, the number of teams increased to 30 and the number of divisions increased to six. This era has seen five seasons where the seasons were changed, three due to labour disputes between the NHL and the players' union, and two due to the COVID-19 pandemic. The 1994–95 and 2012–13 seasons were shortened to 48 intraconference games, and the 2004–05 season's games were cancelled entirely. The 2019–20 season was stopped at 68–71 games due to the COVID–19 pandemic, and resulted in a one-time playoff format change involving 24 teams; the subsequent 2020–21 season was shortened to 56 intradivisional games, with teams temporarily realigned and the playoff format modified. According to the 2011 NHL Guide and Record Book, the NHL includes the 2004–05 season in its count of seasons. For example, the 2011 NHL Guide lists the Tampa Bay Lightning as entering their 19th 'NHL Season', although a count of the Lightning's seasons of play would determine the 2010–11 season to be their 18th season of play.

Notes

All-time top regular season record holders
This table lists the number of times that NHL/NHA teams had the top record in the regular season (this list does not count Stanley Cup/League Champion wins). The Presidents' Trophy is the current award for the team with the best regular season record, which began being awarded starting with the  NHL season. From 1938 to 1967 the Prince of Wales Trophy was the award for the team with the best record in the regular season. Following the expansion of  no award was given until the inception of the Presidents' Trophy.

Notes
Defunct teams denoted in italics.
 The Montreal Canadiens and Ottawa Senators (original) each have 2 top regular season records in the NHA in addition to their NHL seasons.

See also
List of Stanley Cup champions
History of organizational changes in the NHL
List of WHA seasons

References
Footnotes

Bibliography

External links

 
Seasons